Vigilante 3D (Nepali: भिजिलान्ते) is a Nepali social thriller film released on April 5, 2013.  Directed by Dipendra K Khanal and starring Subash Thapa,  Priyanka Karki, Raj Ghimire, Menuka Pradhan and Sikha Shahi, the movie is notable as the first Nepali film to be filmed using 3D Anaglyph stereoscopic 3D effect.  Unfortunately, owing to technical difficulties at many cinemas, the film was only released in 3D to three cinemas, with other patrons seeing a 2D version instead.

Plot outline
Vigilante 3D is a social thriller that follows the events as three extremely infectious diseases (dubbed Lust, Anger and Greed) overtake the human race. The film concentrates on the stories of a few individuals who are infected but unaware of their condition.

Soundtrack

Release and reception
Despite having a limited release, the movie gained a steady performance at the box office. The response from the Audiences of QFX and Fcube cinemas, which mainly entertains Foreign Language movie was generally positive, despite facing tough competition from Hollywood Flick GI:JOE Retaliation.

In its review, National Daily 'Nagarik wrote 'the first Nepali 3D movie is worthy of a watch, you might find the movie much more interesting than the trailer. 
The Himalayan Times reviewed the movie favorably, noting that Shan Basnyat's screenplay was a "satisfactory job with a few loopholes though" and that director Khanal narrated the story with intrigue and suspense, deriving fears in his audience."

References

2013 films
Nepalese thriller films
Films directed by Dipendra K Khanal